Landulf VI may refer to:
Landulf VI of Benevento
Landulf VI of Capua